NGC 4483 is a barred lenticular galaxy located about 55 million light-years away in the constellation of Virgo. NGC 4483 was discovered by astronomer Heinrich d'Arrest on March 19, 1865. NGC 4483 is a member of the Virgo Cluster.

See also 
 List of NGC objects (4001–5000)
 NGC 4340

References

External links 

Barred lenticular galaxies
Virgo (constellation)
4483
Virgo Cluster
41339
7649
Astronomical objects discovered in 1865